Iryna Shynkaruk (born on 31 July 1979) is a Ukrainian singer.

Biography
Shynkaruk was born in 1979 in Fastiv, Kyiv region, in the Ukrainian SSR of the Soviet Union. She spent her childhood in Zhytomyr in western Ukraine but has lived in Kyiv for seven years. She graduated from the Zhytomyr State Teachers‘ Training University, where she studied philology, and the chorus leader and conductors‘ department at the School of Art. She also studied at the National University of Culture and Art, and later started work there as a teacher.

Shynkaruk first took part in pyrping concerts with her father, Volodymyr Shynkaruk at the age of four. In 1990, she won her first music contest, Zamkova Gora in Zhytomyr and went on to win numerous awards for her work. In 1994, she toured five European countries, Hungary, Slovakia, Poland, Germany, and France, together with the wines of Chervona Ruta ’93. Later she toured Austria, Greece, Kazakhstan, Uzbekistan, Cuba, United States, and Libya. She has recorded six music albums and two poetic collections. She is a soloist of the National Radio Company and the senior announcer of the Ukrainian TV Channel Culture.

As the specialists say, Iryna Shynkaruk opened a new style in modern Ukrainian music – magic rock. At present, her repertoire is dominated by dancing music. She is recording a cappella songs.

Competitions and awards
1990 – Zamkova Gora, Zhytomyr
1991 – Solomjanyj Dzvin, Lutsk – First Prize
1991 – II Allukrainian Festival, Chervona Ruta, Zaporizhya – Prize The Hope
1992 – IV Allukrainian Festival Author's song Oberih, Lutsk – Diploma
1993 – Allukrainian Contest New Names, Kyiv – Diploma
1993 – III Allukrainian Festival Chervona Ruta, Donetsk – First Prize
1993 – International Festival Bilostotsky Malvy, Poland – Grand Prix
1993 – Allukrainian Festival of popular Ukrainian music Pisennyj Vernisazh, Kyiv – Diploma
1994 – Training courses Warsaw operetta, Poland
1994 – V International Festival The Voice of Asia, Kazakhstan – Diploma FIDOF, prize for the best song of the festival Misiachny Oberih
1997 – XIV The World Youth Festival, Cuba
1997 – Allukrainian rating popularity Zolota Fortuna, Kyiv – The best young singer of Ukraine
1998 – The World Festival Christian young, Austria
1998 – III International Festival The Sea of Friends, Yalta – Grand Prix
1999 – V Allukrainian TV Festival of the popular music Melodia, Lviv – Grand Prix
1999 – Volodymyr Ivasiuk Festival, Kyiv – Second Prize.

Discography
1994 – П’ята пора року (The Fifth Seasons of the Year)
1996 – Я – наче птиця (I’m Like a Bird)
1998 – Перекоти-поле (Step Towards the Summer)
2000 – Іду до Вас (I’m Coming)
2004 – Відчуваю (I’m Feeling)
2006 – Це моя і твоя Україна (This is my and your Ukraine)

Clips
Ти минаєш (2002), directed by Victor Pryduvalov
ДЕТИДЕЯ (2003), directed by Andriy Novosiolov

Poems
Народження голосу (The Voice Birth) (2001)
Відчуваю (I’m Feeling) (2004)

References

External links
Iryna Shynkaruk official website

1979 births
Living people
Ukrainian pop singers
People from Fastiv
21st-century Ukrainian women  singers